Mark Scott is an American singer best known as a featured vocalist in the 1984 film Breakin II Electric Boogaloo and later as lead singer of The Miracles. 

A native of Flint, Michigan,  Scott has spent nearly two decades as lead singer of the Miracles.  He was selected by original member Bobby Rogers to front the group.

Scott currently leads his own Miracles group.

References

Living people
Year of birth missing (living people)